Elizabeth Allison Miner (née Crowther) (September 23, 1949 – December 23, 1995) was a music promoter and manager who was instrumental in the early production of the New Orleans Jazz & Heritage Festival and the later career of pianist Professor Longhair.

Early life
Allison Miner was born Elizabeth Allison Crowther in Baltimore, Maryland and grew up in Daytona Beach, Florida where she attended Seabreeze High School. During high school she performed as a vocalist with her friend and classmate Duane Allman and his brother Gregg's fledgling band at local venues under the billing A. Miner & The Allman Joys. The brothers would go on to become The Allman Brothers Band.

Career

New Orleans Jazz & Heritage Festival
After moving to New Orleans, LA in 1968, Miner began a career as a music manager, archivist and festival promoter. When George Wein, the founder of the Newport Jazz Festival and Newport Folk Festival, asked the Tulane University Jazz archive's then director Richard Allen to recommend people who could help him launch a New Orleans music festival in Congo Square, he suggested his employee Miner. Miner and  Quint Davis began rounding up interested musicians. The first festival had so few attendees that the staff ended up giving tickets away at a nearby school. The festival grew into what is today the New Orleans Jazz & Heritage Festival.

Miner helped run the festival for its first five years. She is largely credited with the founding the New Orleans Jazz & Heritage Foundation Archive, which contains recordings from musicians interviewed at the festival as well as other documents, photographs and ephemera related to the Festival and the Foundation's holdings including early WWOZ 90.7-FM recordings.

Music manager and producer
She also went on to guide the career of Professor Longhair, aka Henry Roeland Byrd, from the mid-1970s until his death in 1980. During those years, he toured overseas, produced popular recordings and gained critical acclaim. Her husband at the time, Andrew Kaslow, led Professor Longhair's back-up band. "Her devotion to Professor Longhair gave him the best years of his life," Wein was quoted as saying in Miner's obituary that ran in The Times-Picayune.

Miner and Kaslow moved to Cleveland in the mid-1980s, where she produced a Cajun and zydeco radio show at Case Western Reserve University on WRUW 91.1, led the National Folk Festival at the Cuyahoga Valley National Park and was development director at the Cleveland Music School Settlement.

Return to Jazz Fest
Miner returned to New Orleans in 1988, creating the Jazz Fest's Music Heritage Stage, which features interviews with performers. "...'This is my way of bringing the Jazz Fest back to the way it was in the old days, like sitting around the living room floor and getting to know these people,' she said in a 1990 interview. 'It was our way of having a more intimate involvement with the musicians.... We talk and they perform and answer questions from the audience. People say it's like the Oprah Winfrey part of the festival.' Miner, who also became the festival's archivist, said that Jazz Fest 'is a reflection of what the world needs to know about New Orleans music.'...". The Music Heritage stage was later renamed as The Allison Miner Music Heritage Stage, in her honor.

Death and legacy
In December 1995, Miner succumbed to complications from Multiple myeloma, at age 46. Her memorial service and traditional New Orleans jazz funeral were held at City Park and attended by hundreds of people, including many notable musicians from the city such as Kermit Ruffins, the Rebirth Brass Band and the Zion Harmonizers.

Amy Nesbitt created a documentary about Allison based on interviews during the final two years of her life, Reverence: A Tribute To Allison Miner. The project won the New Orleans Film and Video Society Award for Best Short and was produced through the nonprofit Video Veracity which has facilitated dozens of other New Orleans-focused documentaries. Dozens of interviews of crew members who built the festival and local luminaries as well as footage of Allison's memorial ceremony have been gifted by the filmmaker for educational purposes to the New Orleans Jazz and Heritage Festival Foundation Archive, which Miner created for the foundation.

The Heritage Stage at The New Orleans Jazz and Heritage Festival grounds was renamed in her memory as the Allison Miner Music Heritage Stage. After Hurricane Katrina, the stage was temporarily merged with the Lagniappe Stage which is housed in the Grandstand, and in 2009 it was reinstated as a full stage.

In 1997 her book Jazz Fest Memories was published posthumously by Pelican Publishing Company. The book contains photographs by her long time friend Michael P. Smith and descriptions and stories of the early days of the festival by Miner.

Personal life
Miner is the first cousin five times removed to Sir Moses Montefiore on her father's side. Her uncle Frank Crowther was a speechwriter for Robert F. Kennedy in the 1960s and close personal friend to Norman Mailer. Her paternal grandfather Rodney Crowther was the chief war correspondent in Europe during World War II for The Baltimore Sun. She is survived by her two sons, Jonathan and Rashi Kaslow.

References

External links
Reverence: A Tribute to Allison Miner; a short documentary offering a look at the life and work of Allison Miner through her own words (Produced and directed by Amy Nesbitt)
Obituary: Allison Miner; a personal obituary by Jerry Brock, published on February 1, 1996, at the OffBeat Magazine (retrieved September 10, 2018)

1949 births
1995 deaths
Deaths from multiple myeloma
Businesspeople from Baltimore
American music managers
Seabreeze High School alumni
20th-century American businesspeople